John Cougar is the third studio album by John Mellencamp. It was his first album to be released by his new record company Riva Records and to credit him as "John Cougar". Released in 1979, following the success in Australia of the single "I Need a Lover" from his previous album A Biography (which did not receive a U.S. release), John Cougar included the aforementioned track for U.S. audiences, as well as a re-working of A Biographys "Taxi Dancer".

"I Need a Lover", upon the release of this album, became a Top 40 hit in the U.S., peaking at No. 28 in December 1979, after having been a No. 5 hit in Australia in 1978 when it was released as a single from A Biography. "Miami" was also a hit single in Australia, his second Top 40 hit in that country. "I Need a Lover" was subsequently covered by Pat Benatar on her album In the Heat of the Night. In the U.S., however, "Small Paradise" was released as a single in place of "Miami", but it was not very successful, peaking at No. 87 on the Billboard Hot 100 in February 1980. During concerts in 1979 and 1980, guitarist Mike Wanchic would trade lead vocals with Mellencamp on "Miami".

Record World said of the single "Small Paradise" that it's "a deliberate, ballad pace with Cougar's raw vocal exuding tension and drama" and praised the hook and vocal performance.

Record World said of the single "A Little Night Dancin'" that its "light Latin rhythm provides a backdrop for Cougar to project his vivid urban images."

Mellencamp recorded a solo acoustic rendition of "Sugar Marie" for his 2010 box set On the Rural Route 7609, stating in the set's liner notes: "'Sugar Marie' suffered from young musicians not knowing how to present the music. I've always had an affection for the song, and I've always known it had something I didn't get at on the album."

On his inspiration for writing "I Need A Lover", his first Top 40 hit, Mellencamp said: "The song's about a friend of mine who goes to Concordia College. When that song was written, he was pretty sad. I told him, ‘You got to get the hell out of the house!’ He’d say, ‘Man, if I only had a girl, she’d make me forget my problems.’ I just said, ‘Well . . . ’"

Track listing
All songs written by John Mellencamp, except where noted.
 "A Little Night Dancin'" – 3:43
 "Small Paradise" – 3:40
 "Miami" – 3:53
 "Great Mid-west" – 4:29
 "Do You Think That's Fair" – 4:48
 "I Need a Lover" – 5:35
 "Welcome to Chinatown" – 3:59
 "Sugar Marie" – 4:16
 "Pray for Me" – 3:30 (Mellencamp, Brian Bec Var)
 "Taxi Dancer"  – 5:02
 "Take Home Pay" (2005 re-issue bonus track) – 3:10

Personnel
 John Mellencamp - vocal, guitar
 Brian Bec Var - piano, keyboards
 Larry Crane - guitars, backing vocals
 Mike "Chief" Wanchic - guitars, backing vocals
 Robert "Ferd" Frank - bass
 Tom Knowles - drums
 Don Gehman - engineer

Charts

References

Online references

External links
 

John Mellencamp albums
1979 albums
Albums produced by John Punter
Riva Records albums